Alisson Krystle Perticheto (born 18 September 1997) is a former Swiss-Filipino figure skater who represented the Philippines. She is the 2017 Egna Spring Trophy champion, 2015 Skate Helena silver medalist, and 2014 Philippines national champion. She has competed in the free skate at three ISU Championships, placing 18th at 2013 Junior Worlds in Milan, Italy; 17th at 2014 Four Continents in Taipei, Taiwan; and 16th at 2015 Four Continents in Seoul, South Korea.

In August 2022, Perticheto transitioned to coaching.

Programs

Competitive highlights 
CS: Challenger Series; JGP: Junior Grand Prix

For the Philippines

For Switzerland

Detailed results

References

External links 

 

1997 births
Filipino female single skaters
Swiss female single skaters
Swiss people of Filipino descent
Living people
Sportspeople from Geneva
Southeast Asian Games bronze medalists for the Philippines
Southeast Asian Games medalists in figure skating
Competitors at the 2017 Southeast Asian Games
Competitors at the 2019 Southeast Asian Games
Southeast Asian Games silver medalists for the Philippines
Figure skating coaches